Wu Kai Sha, formerly known as Wu Kwai Sha or U Kwai Sha, is a place at the shore of Tolo Harbour, northwest of Ma On Shan in the New Territories, Hong Kong. Wu Kai Sha is within the Sha Tin District, one of the 18 districts of Hong Kong.

Administration
Wu Kai Sha (including Cheung Kang) is a recognized village under the New Territories Small House Policy. Wu Kai Sha is one of the villages represented within the Sha Tin Rural Committee. For electoral purposes, Wu Kai Sha is part of the Wu Kai Sha constituency, which is currently represented by Li Wing-shing.

History
Originally there were only a few villages in the area, like Wu Kai Sha Village. It is now an extension of the Ma On Shan New Town.

At the time of the 1911 census, the population of Wu Kai Sha Village was 135. The number of males was 59.

The vicinity to the northeast is called  in English. The area was once home to the largest of the detention centres for Vietnamese boat people in Hong Kong.

Features
Wu Kai Sha is famous for a campsite, Wu Kwai Sha Youth Village of YMCA. There is also a beach near the Wu Kai Sha Youth Village.

Transport 
Before the area was developed, there existed only rough roads to the area. Many residents and visitors took kai to boats from Ma Liu Shui, near the MTR University station, across Tolo Harbour to the area.

With the extension of the new town to the northwestern side of Ma On Shan, roads were extended and expanded. Sai Sha Road is an alternative route to Sai Kung. In 2001, the Kowloon-Canton Railway Corporation began construction of the Ma On Shan Rail (now the Tuen Ma line), which currently terminates at Wu Kai Sha station.

See also
 Cheung Kang

References 

(Map) War Office (1936, 3rd Ed.), Hong Kong University Press. (1957, 4th Ed., Chinese character added). Hong Kong and The New Territories, Hong Kong University Press.

External links

 Delineation of area of existing village Wu Kai Sha and Cheung Kang (Sha Tin) for election of resident representative (2019 to 2022)
 

 
Ma On Shan